John Gaulton Hubbard, MBE (16 December 1930 – 21 June 2018) was a South African footballer. Hubbard spent the majority of his career at Scottish club Rangers, and later played for English club Bury before ending his career back in Scotland with Ayr United. He was the first African player to compete in the European Cup, having played in October 1956 with Rangers versus Nice, and also the first African player to score a goal in the competition.

He became one of the few players to score a hat-trick in an Old Firm match, which he achieved on 1 January 1955, the only foreign player in Rangers' history to do so. Hubbard was nicknamed the "Penalty King" by Rangers fans, due to his exceptional record of 65 goals scored from 68 penalty kicks, 22 consecutively.

He left Rangers in 1959 with 172 appearances and 77 goals for the club, moving to Bury for £6,000. After three years at Bury he returned to Scotland, spending two years with Ayr United before retiring from football to work as a physical education teacher and a community sports development officer. In 2007, he was named an honorary member of the Rangers Supporters Trust, along with Mark Walters and Billy Simpson.

Hubbard died in June 2018, aged 87.

Honours
Rangers
 Scottish first-tier League Championships (5): 1949–50, 1952–53, 1955–56, 1956–57, 1958–59
 Scottish Cup (2): 1949–50, 1952–53

References

External links
 Career history

1930 births
2018 deaths
Soccer players from Pretoria
South African soccer players
South African expatriate soccer players
Expatriate footballers in England
Expatriate footballers in Scotland
Rangers F.C. players
Bury F.C. players
Ayr United F.C. players
South African Members of the Order of the British Empire
English Football League players
Scottish Football League players
Scottish Football League representative players
South African expatriate sportspeople in England
South African expatriate sportspeople in Scotland
Association football wingers
South African emigrants to the United Kingdom
South African schoolteachers
White South African people